Philip Ayton (born 26 January 1947) is an English former professional squash player. He reached a career-high world ranking of 4 in February 1986.

References

1947 births
Living people
English male squash players